Donald Bailey may refer to:

Sir Donald Bailey (civil engineer) (1901–1985), British civil engineer
Donald A. Bailey (1945–2020), American politician and lawyer
Donald Bailey (musician) (1934–2013), American jazz drummer
Donald Bailey (architect), Australian architect
Donald Bailey (Manitoba politician)
Don Bailey (American football) (born 1961), American football player